Trochocarpa laurina is an Australian shrub or small tree. It occurs from near Bermagui (36° S) in southern coastal New South Wales to the Wet Tropics in Queensland. It grows at the summit of Mount Bellenden Ker, which has an average annual rainfall of 8312 mm. The minimum annual rainfall requirement is 1200 mm.

The habitat is rainforest of various types and wet sclerophyll forest. Common names include tree heath, axebreaker, sandberry, wheel-fruit, waddy wood, laurel heath and turkey bush.

Description
A small tree or shrub with a corky trunk, and heavy low branches. The crooked trunk can be up to 45 cm in diameter, slightly flanged at the base. Often seen around 4 metres tall.

Leaves alternate, grouped at the ends of the branchlets. Not toothed, elliptic, 5 to 7 cm long, pointed at the tip. Glossy green both sides, paler beneath. Five to seven parallel  and longitudinal veins on the leaf. New leaves brilliant dark pink or red.

White flowers single or on spikes, 2 to 3 cm long form in all months, mostly seen in June and July. The fruit is a small flattened drupe; purple to black in colour, maturing from March to October. Within the aril of the drupe is a ten ribbed bony endocarp, each of the ten cells within contains a seed. Seed germination is very slow and difficult, taking between two and four years for the first seedling to appear. Fruit eaten by Lewin's honeyeater and the pied currawong.

Ecology and uses
Host to the parasitic mistletoe Korthasella rubra ("korthal mistletoe"). Host tree for epiphytes including bird's-nest fern and elk horn fern. Used by Aboriginal Australians for waddies. Timber is hard with an attractive grain.

References

laurina
Ericales of Australia
Trees of Australia
Flora of Queensland
Flora of New South Wales